The Seymour Collection is a collection of philatelic material relating to the development and operation of the de Havilland Comet aircraft, that forms part of the British Library Philatelic Collections. The collection was formed by Kenneth Seymour and donated to the library by his daughter Yvonne Wallace and his son Derek Seymour in 2003.

See also
Aerophilately

References

British Library Philatelic Collections
Philately of the United Kingdom